Maurizio Donadoni (born 7 January 1958) is an Italian film, stage and television actor.

Born in Bergamo, Donadoni started his career on stage in the late 1970s, working among others with Luca Ronconi and Gabriele Lavia. He made his film debut in 1982, working mainly with young directors, but also collaborating with established directors such as Marco Ferreri, Marco Bellocchio and Marco Tullio Giordana. He is also active on television, appearing in a number of series and TV-movies of some success.

Selected filmography  

 The Story of Piera  (1983) 
 The Future Is Woman  (1984) 
 I Love You (1986) 
 The Moro Affair (1986) 
 Sweets from a Stranger (1987) 
 A Violent Life (1990) 
 Reflections in a Dark Sky (1991)
 Who Wants to Kill Sara? (1992) 
 An Eyewitness Account (1997) 
 In Love and War (2001) 
 My Mother's Smile (2002) 
 Nero (2004) 
 Wild Blood (2004) 
 The Wedding Director (2006) 
 Caravaggio (2007) 
 Pinocchio (2008) 
 A Quiet Life (2010) 
 The Solitude of Prime Numbers (2010)
 The Complexity of Happiness (2015)

References

External links 
 

1958 births
Italian male film actors
Italian male television actors
Italian male stage actors
Actors from Bergamo
20th-century Italian male actors
Living people